Matthew Richardson (born 6 September 1985) is a South African cricketer. He played in 13 first-class and 16 List A matches for Border from 2006 to 2009.

See also
 List of Border representative cricketers

References

External links
 

1985 births
Living people
South African cricketers
Border cricketers
Cricketers from Port Elizabeth